SS Brisbane was an 85.8 metres long passenger, cargo and mail ship, built by A & J Inglis, Pointhouse, Glasgow, launched in 1874. It was owned by the Eastern & Australian Mail Steamship Co Ltd.

On 10 October 1881 it struck the Fish Reef near Quail Island, 26 miles from Port Darwin, while heading there with cargo from Hong Kong. All passengers and crew were landed safely. However within a fortnight the stranded Brisbane had broken her back and had to be abandoned.

References 

1874 ships
Shipwrecks of the Northern Territory
Ships built in Glasgow
1874 establishments in Scotland
1881 in Australia